Joseph Clemens (9 December 1862 – 21 January 1936) was an American Methodist Episcopalian chaplain, missionary and plant collector who served and worked in South East Asia and elsewhere. He was born in the rugged western English county of Cornwall. Later, his family migrated to Williamsport, Pennsylvania, and then moved to Eichelsburg, Pennsylvania. His father was a Cornish iron miner, Charles Clemens, and his mother, Mary Jane James Clemens. Joe was the only one of five brothers who did not follow the family tradition and become a miner. He also had a sister.

Education
In 1890, at the age of 28, he entered Dickinson College in Carlisle, Pennsylvania after probable preparation at the Williamsport Seminary, which was a secondary school and a source of Dickinson students at the time. While at Dickinson, Joseph took the basic courses and studied to be a missionary. Among his courses of study were Dutch, German, Greek, Latin, and Hebrew, as well as Physics, Chemistry, Analytical Geometry, Political Economics, English Literature and Psychology.  While at Dickinson, he was a member of the Sigma-Phi chapter of Sigma Alpha Epsilon, and he wrote one of the yearly histories for the fraternity. He was the treasurer for the Union Philosophical Society and exhibited his religious zeal by being the treasurer of the Dickinson Prohibition Club. He played in the College orchestra and sang in the College choir. He was also a member of the Democratic committee at the college YMCA and the class poet.

Pointing to his eventual missionary status, he was a member of the Missionary department at the College YMCA and the corresponding secretary of the Williamsport Seminary Club. While at Dickinson, he passed most of his time with his involvement in his many activities4. He also played checkers, wrote letters to friends, acquaintances, family, church, and, of course, to his fiancé, Mary Knapp Strong of Muncy County, and studied. Many of his weekends were spent traveling to Williamsport to spend time with Mary.

Missionary work
After graduation, from 1894–1901 Clemens was a pastor for the Central Pennsylvania Methodist Episcopal Conference. In 1896 he married Mary Knapp Strong. In 1901 he decided to serve his country and became a chaplain in the United States Army. After his commissioning, he was sent almost directly to Hawaii with the Fifteenth Infantry.

From Hawaii, he was moved to the new American possession of the Philippines, recently obtained from Spain in the Spanish–American War. One of his tasks was to bring "civilization" to the local population through missionary service. During one of his first services, on April 13, 1902, more than a hundred locals attended. After that, he held weekly services. The numbers interested fluctuated; on April 20, for example, there were only 50 in attendance, though the following week the number went back up to 75. Also, in 1902, while in Samar, he helped to wipe out a cholera epidemic threatening all there. In 1905, the Clemenses made the voyage to Mindanao, where he not only continued his missionary practice, but he also began a botanical study with guidance from his wife.

In 1918 he was forced to retire from the military due to injury. He spent five months lecturing in Pennsylvania in small towns, factories, schools and churches and with the money he earned, he made an endowment to Dickinson College to support its missions.

The Clemenses returned to the Philippines in 1922. There, he spent six and a half years doing evangelical work in Luzon. During this time, he baptized 16,000 people.

Botanical collecting
Joseph began to learn botany at his wife's prodding. She learned the study of flora after she gave up her dreams of being a musician. In 1915, while living in a mission camp and continuing to preach to the natives, Joseph and Mary made their first study together at Mount Kinabalu in North Borneo. In a period of six weeks they found and documented 101 new species of plants. In July 1931 he and his wife moved onward, leaving Luzon and the Philippines for Borneo again. There they began a plant collecting expedition which was later commissioned by the British Museum.

Still having a soft spot for Dickinson College, he and Mary created the Joseph and Mary Strong Clemens Scholarship Fund for students of Dickinson who are studying the ministry of the Methodist Episcopal Church. In that same year, 1934, he and Mary had an article about them published in the Manila Bulletin, celebrating the advances that they have made in the botanical sciences. Meanwhile, he maintained contacts with his limestone alma mater half a world away, writing a letter to the college in 1935 that became an article in the Dickinson Alumnus. It describes one of his trips to the Islands, and his impressions of the natives he found there.

Death
Clemens died on 21 January 1936, some weeks after his seventy-third birthday, in New Guinea from food poisoning contracted from eating contaminated wild boar meat. The College Alumni Magazine paid tribute in an obituary in May 1936. The couple had never had any children, and Mary spent the rest of her life, from the outbreak of war in the Pacific when she was evacuated from New Guinea, in Australia, most of it working at the Queensland Herbarium. Upon the discovery of his diaries, she donated them to the Dickinson College archives.

Achievements
Joseph Clemens was one of many from the Dickinson family who traveled abroad spreading the knowledge gained within the old gray walls to the farthest points in the world. During most of the early years of the college, the vast majority of these students were Methodist and Presbyterian missionaries who sought to spread western ideas to the "less fortunate." Clemens, even if completely in this tradition, engaged his world also as a soldier for a United States making its own first move towards international power. Finally, the curiosity he had exhibited his whole life made him the perfect scientific partner for an impressive woman botanical pioneer. Joseph Clemens, all in all, serves as a fascinating example of the historical moment when Dickinsonians so engaged the world.

See also
 Mary Strong Clemens

References
 Hanners, Amy; & Webb, Gregory. Joseph Clemens: Soldier, Scientist, and Missionary.  Accessed 19 July 2007

1862 births
1936 deaths
American Methodist missionaries
American botanists
Dickinson College alumni
World War I chaplains
United States Army chaplains
Plant collectors
American expatriates in the Philippines
Methodist missionaries in the Philippines
British emigrants to the United States
Missionary botanists